The Archbishop of Vancouver is the head of the Roman Catholic Archdiocese of Vancouver who is responsible for looking after its "spiritual and administrative needs". As the archdiocese is the metropolitan see of the ecclesiastical province encompassing nearly all of British Columbia, the Archbishop of Vancouver also administers the bishops who head the suffragan dioceses of Kamloops, Nelson, Prince George, and Victoria.  The current archbishop is J. Michael Miller.

The archdiocese began as the Vicariate Apostolic of British Columbia, which was created on December 14, 1863.  Louis-Joseph d'Herbomez was appointed its first bishop, and under his reign, the first parish was formed at the Holy Rosary church. On September 2, 1890, the vicariate was elevated to the status of diocese by Pope Leo XIII and was based in New Westminster.  On account of the rapid expansion and development of Vancouver, the Holy See decided to centre the archdiocese around the city.  As a result, the Diocese of New Westminster became the Archdiocese of Vancouver, and the Archdiocese of Victoria was reduced to diocesan level on September 7, 1908. Augustin Dontenwill became the first archbishop of the newly-formed metropolitan see in Vancouver, British Columbia.

Nine men have been Archbishop of Vancouver; another two were heads of its antecedent jurisdictions.  Of these, four were members of the Missionary Oblates of Mary Immaculate (OMI), and one (Dontenwill) became the superior general of the order.  Neil McNeil, the fourth ordinary of the archdiocese, was the first archbishop who did not belong to a religious order.  James Carney, whose episcopacy spanned from 1969 to 1990, was the first archbishop born in Vancouver. William Mark Duke had the longest tenure as Archbishop of Vancouver, serving for 33 years from 1931 to 1964, while McNeil held the position for two years (1910–1912), marking the shortest archepiscopacy.

List of ordinaries

Apostolic Vicars of British Columbia

Bishops of New Westminster

Archbishops of Vancouver

Notes

References
GeneralSpecific

External links

 Archdiocesan website

 
Christianity in Vancouver
Vancouver
 
Archbishops